Yang Ying is a Chinese table tennis player, born 13 July 1977 in Xuzhou, Jiangsu Province. She achieved gold medals at several World Table Tennis Championships in either doubles or team play. She played right-handed Chinese penhold style. Her main techniques were forehand and backhand speed drives. Since 2008 Yang has been working as a table tennis commentator for CCTV-5.

Career performance
4th Table Tennis World Cup (1995) Women's Team Gold.
44th World Table Tennis Championship (1997) Women's Team Gold.
44th World Table Tennis Championship (1997) Women's Double Gold.
13th Asian Games (1998) Table Tennis Women's Team Gold.
45th World Table Tennis Championship (1999) Women's Double Silver.
27th Olympic Games (2000) Table Tennis Women's Double Silver.
International Table Tennis Tournament (2001) Grand Finals Women's Double Gold.
46th World Table Tennis Championship (2001) Women's Team Gold.
46th World Table Tennis Championship (2001) Women's Double Silver.
46th World Table Tennis Championship (2001) Mixed Double Gold.

References

1977 births
Living people
Chinese female table tennis players
Olympic medalists in table tennis
Table tennis players from Jiangsu
Sportspeople from Xuzhou
Medalists at the 2000 Summer Olympics
Olympic silver medalists for China
Olympic table tennis players of China
Asian Games medalists in table tennis
Table tennis players at the 1998 Asian Games
Medalists at the 1998 Asian Games
Asian Games gold medalists for China
Table tennis players at the 2000 Summer Olympics
21st-century Chinese women